The 1925 Baden state election was held on 25 October 1925 to elect the 72 members of the Landtag of the Republic of Baden.

Results

References 

1925 elections in Germany
1925